Jane Rose Waring Roberts (née Waring;  1819January 10, 1914) emigrated as a child with her free African-American family to the Colony of Liberia, where she was educated and grew up as a member of the Americo-Liberian community. 

She married politician Joseph Jenkins Roberts, also an American immigrant, who was appointed as governor of the colony. When he was elected President after Liberia's independence, she served as the first First Lady of the Republic of Liberia from 1848 to 1856. After he was re-elected, she served again from 1872 to 1876. She accompanied him on numerous diplomatic trips to other nations. She also promoted women's education.

As a widow, Roberts traveled to the United Kingdom in the late nineteenth century to raise funds to build a hospital in Monrovia; she met with Queen Victoria for a second time. From 1906 to her death, she lived in London with a political black couple, former mayor John Archer and his wife. She was interred at Streatham Cemetery in the city.

Early life
Jane Rose Waring was born free in the American state of Virginia around 1819. She was one of several children in the Waring family, which was prominent in Virginia's sizeable free black community. Her father, Colston Waring, was a minister and a successful businessman.  He sold his notable holdings in the United States in order to emigrate via the American Colonization Society to Liberia, a newly established colony in West Africa.

Emigration to Liberia
Jane's mother and her six children, including four-year-old Jane, followed Colston Waring and arrived in Liberia on February 13, 1824, having sailed on the Cyrus. Two of Jane's brothers, one older and one younger, died of "fever" in the first year. Another older brother and an older sister died in 1828. 

The family settled in Monrovia, where her father established a profitable commercial firm. Colston Waring was appointed as vice colonial agent of Liberia and died in 1838. 

Jane Waring was educated in Monrovia. She learned to read and write, and speak fluent French as well as English. She dedicated her life to Christian charities and the promotion of women's education.

Marriage and family

In 1836, Waring at about the age of 17 married Joseph Jenkins Roberts. A widower, he was a free-born merchant from Virginia who had immigrated in 1829 to Liberia with his young family. His first wife and infant child died within the first year of their arriving at Monrovia. 

Waring's marriage to Roberts connected the two families, consolidating their wealth and social status. The couple had one child together, Sarah Ann Roberts, in 1838. They sent her to England for much of her education. Sarah Ann married William A. Johnson.

Political life
Joseph Jenkins Roberts advanced as a political leader and served as governor of Liberia from 1842 to 1848. Jane Roberts effectively served as the first First Lady. She also made contributions to farming, such as raising turkeys. She took a role in educating some Liberian children. 

In 1847, the Republic of Liberia declared independence from the United States, and Joseph Roberts was elected as the first president. He served until 1856. This lengthy tenure enlarged his wife's influence as the first First Lady of the nation. 

President Roberts made diplomatic visits to several countries and met with several heads of state, in an effort to gain recognition for the Republic of Liberia. His wife Jane sometimes accompanied him, including to Barbados, the United States, England, Belgium, and France. When they made a state visit to England, Queen Victoria received the couple on her royal yacht and honored them with a seventeen-gun salute. The couple returned to Monrovia on a British warship. French President Louis Napoleon III met with the couple twice, including in 1851. Later his government donated equipment to the Liberian military.

In 1856, Joseph left the presidency. He was selected as president of the newly established Liberia College, serving until 1872. That year he returned to politics and was re-elected to Liberia's presidency. Jane Roberts again served as first lady. 

In 1872, Roberts lost both a sister, Susannah (Waring) Lewis, and their mother, Harriet (Graves) Waring Brander. After being widowed, her mother had remarried by 1847 to Nathaniel Brander, who also was a politician. He served with Joseph Roberts as Vice-President.
  
Joseph Roberts died in 1876, soon after he resigned from the presidency. Jane had tried unsuccessfully to nurse him back to health when he was ill.

Widowhood and death

The widowed Jane Roberts continued to be active in her community. In 1887, she started a project to construct a hospital in Monrovia. While raising money, she visited the United States, where she dined with President Grover Cleveland and his wife at the White House. She was the only black woman to do so. President Cleveland contributed money to the hospital project. In 1891, she spoke at the annual meeting of the Pennsylvania Colonization Society, which had been one of the state societies supporting American settlement in Liberia.

In July 1892, Jane Roberts represented her government in meeting a second time with Queen Victoria, at Windsor Castle. She was to present a quilt for the queen, made by Americo-Liberian Martha Ricks over a period of twenty-five years. Roberts and the Liberian ambassador arranged for Ricks to accompany her and present the quilt personally to Victoria. 

Decades later, African-American artist Elton Fax drew a quick illustration of this Roberts/Ricks-Queen Victoria meeting and a larger portrait of Roberts, based on the 1905 photograph on this page, and entitled "They'll Never Die". The brief piece was published in 1949 in local newspapers.

Roberts returned to England after the turn of the century. From 1906 until her death, she lived in London with a British couple, politician John Archer, the first black mayor of Battersea, a borough of London, and his wife Bertha. In England, she continued to raise funds for the Monrovia hospital, often through gifts from friends. Hallie Quinn Brown noted in a 1910 visit that Roberts at ninety-one years old was still "clear in mind and wonderfully active." 

On January 10, 1914, Jane Roberts died in the Archer home. She was one of the oldest members of the Liberian community. She was interred at Streatham Cemetery in London.

References

1810s births
1914 deaths
American emigrants to Liberia
Americo-Liberian people
Burials at Streatham Cemetery
First ladies and gentlemen of Liberia
Liberian expatriates in England
People from London
People from Monrovia
People from Virginia
Roberts family (Liberia)
19th-century African-American people
19th-century Liberian people
20th-century Liberian people
19th-century Liberian women
20th-century Liberian women